The 2009 Grand Prix de Tennis de Lyon was a men's tennis tournament played on indoor hard courts. It was the 23rd edition of the Grand Prix de Tennis de Lyon, and was part of the ATP World Tour 250 Series of the 2009 ATP World Tour. It was held at the Palais des Sports de Gerland in Lyon, France, from 26 October through 1 November 2009. Tird-seeded Ivan Ljubičić won the singles title.

Finals

Singles

 Ivan Ljubičić defeated  Michaël Llodra 7–5, 6–3
Ljubičić wins his first title of the year and ninth of his career. It was his second win at the event, also winning in 2001.

Doubles

 Julien Benneteau /  Nicolas Mahut defeated  Arnaud Clément /  Sébastien Grosjean 6–4, 7–6(8–6)

ATP entrants

Seeds

 Seeds are based on the rankings of October 19, 2009

Other entrants
The following players received wildcards into the singles main draw:
  Arnaud Clément
  Sébastien Grosjean
  Michaël Llodra

The following players received entry from the qualifying draw: 
  Kevin Anderson
  David Guez
  Jérôme Haehnel
  Vincent Millot

External links
Official website

 
G
Grand Prix de Tennis de Lyon
Grand Prix de Tennis de Lyon